The Harina P.A.N. (abbreviation for National Food Product. {English}), is the first brand of boiled maize flour in Venezuela. The brand itself became a synecdoche, as even with other large competitors in the market, it is used as a noun to indicate any similar maize flour.

Usage

Harina PAN is used to make the maize flour dough also known as "masa de arepa" or "masarepa", which is used to make Venezuelan dishes such as arepas, hallacas, empanadas, bollos pelones, and several Colombian dishes. Harina PAN is commonly found in varieties made from white and yellow corn. It contains no additives or gluten and is considered suitable for those with restricted diets.

History
The traditional preparation of arepa flour is very labor-intensive, requiring soaking, dehusking, and drying maize before pounding it in a large mortar. 

Precooked arepa flour was invented in the 1950s by Dr. Luis Caballero Mejías, a Venezuelan engineer who used the profits from his patent to finance a Technical Schools system.

In 1954, the Venezuelan beer and malted drinks company Empresas Polar developed an industrial production method, launching the brand in 1960. Its spokesmen said that had been the idea of Czech master brewer Carlos Roubicek, one of the first employees of the Polar Brewery, and Juan Lorenzo Mendoza Quintero, son of the founder Lorenzo Mendoza Fleury, taking advantage of the Remavenca machinery and the corn flakes manufactured in that plant to improve the beer flavor. In fact, Empresas Polar does not accredit Luis Caballero Mejías, for the development of the process that served for the production of maize flour.

The brand name Harina P.A.N. was proposed by Empresas Polar's then President and Chairman of the Board Carlos Eduardo Stolk. He selected the acronym "P.A.N.," in Spanish "Producto Alimenticio Nacional," or in English, "National Food Product," to represent a food product for mass consumption for all Venezuelans."

The original slogan was "Se acabó la piladera", which means "No more pounding". The marketing has remained essentially unchanged since then. The precooked flour was later mass-produced and sold in larger quantities.

Cultural influence
For decades, Harina PAN has been an essential ingredient for Venezuelans, and also in Colombian cooking, with websites dedicated to locating the nearest distributor in several countries in the world. Pre-made arepa flour is specially prepared for making arepas and other maize dough-based dishes, such as Venezuelan Hallaca, Bollo, and Empanada. The most popular brand names of corn flour are Harina PAN in Venezuela, and Areparina in Colombia. Pre-made arepa flour is usually made from white corn, but there are yellow corn varieties available.

To Venezuelans, Harina PAN forms a part of their national identity by making up a large portion of their diet.

Operation Area
Venezuela, Colombia, United States, Spain, Mexico .

References

Empresas Polar
Venezuelan cuisine
Food product brands
Venezuelan brands
Products introduced in 1960